The  is a class of helicopter carrier built for the Japan Maritime Self-Defense Force (JMSDF). Two - Hyūga and Ise - were built; upon completion the class were the largest ships built for the Japanese navy since the Second World War. Hyūga was described in a PBS documentary as the "first Japanese aircraft carrier built since WWII".

The Hyūgas were followed by the larger , the first being commissioned in March 2015. The Izumos will replace the  helicopter destroyers; the Hyūgas were originally meant to replace the Shiranes.

The specifications of the Hyūga class are comparable to light aircraft carriers, such as the Italian  and Spanish . Under the JMSDF's naming conventions, the ships are called goei-kan (護衛艦, lit. "escort ship") in Japanese and destroyer in English, as same as all the other combatant ships of JMSDF.

During development, Hyūga and Ise were provisionally named "16DDH" and "18DDH" respectively. The numbers derived from the Japanese calendar, specifically the 16th year and 18th year of the Heisei reign (2004 and 2006), when the provisional name were given.

Design and specifications
The Hyūgas are primarily anti-submarine warfare carriers operating SH-60K anti-submarine helicopters. They also have enhanced command-and-control capabilities to serve as flagships. During peacetime, Hyūgas and  ships could operate together to conduct military operations other than war, peacekeeping and relief operations.

The ships are armed with a 16-cell VLS carrying the Evolved Sea Sparrow Missile surface-to-air missile, and Phalanx close in weapon system for self-defense. They are also equipped with the ATECS command system and FCS-3 fire control with active electronically scanned array radar system.

Globalsecurity.org suggests a maximum capacity of 18-24 H-60 class helicopters, or a smaller number of larger helicopters, even though the official complement was reported as three Mitsubishi H-60 and one AgustaWestland AW101 helicopters, or three Mitsubishi H-60 and one Sikorsky CH-53 Sea Stallion helicopters. The ships have also operated JGSDF Fuji AH-64D Apache attack helicopters during joint amphibious exercises with the United States. It is speculated that future modifications may allow the operation of VTOL/STOVL fixed-wing aircraft, such as Harriers or F-35 Lightning II.

In 2013, the USMC operated V-22 Ospreys on Hyūga during joint amphibious exercises.

In 2016, MV-22 Ospreys operated off Hyūga in the participation of relief efforts following the Kumamoto earthquake.

Ships in the class
Construction of the first ship, JS Hyūga, was started in 2006 and it was launched on 23 August 2007. The second was launched and named JS Ise on 21 August 2009.

Hyūga was named after  (present-day Miyazaki Prefecture) on the east coast of Kyūshū, and Ise after  (present-day Mie Prefecture). These two ships had been built during World War I and served in World War II. Following the Battle of Midway, Hyūga and Ise were converted into a hybrid battleship/aircraft carriers in 1943 with the replacement of the aft gun turrets and barbettes by a small aircraft handling deck and hangar deck with which they could launch a squadron of Yokosuka D4Y dive-bombers and Aichi E16A seaplanes.

In November 2009, Hyūga participated in "Annualex 21G" joint naval exercise with the US aircraft carrier  and other USN and JMSDF ships to maintain the interoperability between the two navies.

On 11 March 2011, the 2011 Tōhoku earthquake and tsunami struck the northeast part of Japan. Hyūga immediately moved to off the coast of Miyagi prefecture and started search and rescue operations. Ise, which went into service on 16 March, also will join aid delivery operation for refuge shelters.

On 8 November 2013, Super-Typhoon Haiyan crossed the Visayas, Philippines. Ise joined the relief operation, using its helicopters to provide relief supplies to remote areas cut off by the storm.

Gallery

Notes

References

External links

 Hyuga Class helicopter destroyer
 Japan Launches Carrier ... Sorta
  Color Image (Ships of the World No.650 )
  Photos

Destroyer classes